Emballonuridae is a family of microbats, many of which are referred to as  sac-winged slinging slayer or sheath-tailed bats. They are widely distributed in tropical and subtropical regions around the world. The earliest fossil records are from the Eocene.

Description
The emballonurids include some of the smallest of all bats, and range from 3.5 to 10 cm in body length. They are generally brown or grey, although the species of genus Diclidurus are white. The faces are said to be handsome, the heads being comparable to those of domestic dogs, and their wings are long and narrow. As with other microchiropteran families, they use ultrasonic echolocation to sense the surrounding environment and their prey; the signals of some species are unusual in being audible to humans.

Possession of the postorbital processes, the reduced, noncontacting premaxillaries, and rather simple shoulder and elbow joints, which is similar to pteropodids, makes them rather a primitive group. However, they are more advanced in the reduction of the second digit phalanges and the flexion of the third digit proximal phalanges over the metacarpal dorsal side.

The wing surface extends between the legs, a membrane known as a uropatagium, and the structure of these is a characteristic in many of the genera. They have tails which are partially enclosed, a short part of which projects through the uropatagium to form a sheath. The usual arrangement of the uropatagium is as to be fixed to the tail, but the sheathtail feature is joined by an elastic component which allows greater flexibility; they are able to use the hind legs for locomotion and to adjust the membrane's surface while in flight. As a common name indicates, many species also possess sac-shaped glands in their wings (propatagium), which are open to the air and may release pheromones to attract mates. Other species have throat glands which produce strong-smelling secretions. They have the dental formula 

These bats generally prefer to roost in better-illuminated areas than other species of bats. Their dwellings can often be found in hollow trees and entryways to caves or other structures. Some  species, such as the genus Taphozous, live in large colonies, but others are solitary. Species living away from the tropics may enter periods of torpor or extended hibernation during colder months.

Emballonurids feed mainly on insects and occasionally on fruit. Most of these bats catch their meals while flying.

The common name for some groups, 'sheath-tailed bats', is sometimes noted as sheathtails.

Distribution
Found in the Neotropics, Afrotropics, southern Asia, Australia and South Pacific islands.

Classification
Family Emballonuridae
Genus Balantiopteryx
Ecuadorian sac-winged bat, Balantiopteryx infusca
Thomas's sac-winged bat, Balantiopteryx io
Gray sac-winged bat, Balantiopteryx plicata
Genus Centronycteris
Thomas's shaggy bat, Centronycteris centralis
Shaggy bat, Centronycteris maximiliani
Genus Coleura
African sheath-tailed bat, Coleura afra
Madagascar sheath-tailed bat, Coleura kibomalandy
Seychelles sheath-tailed bat, Coleura seychellensis
Genus Cormura
Chestnut sac-winged bat, Cormura brevirostris
Genus Cyttarops
Short-eared bat, Cyttarops alecto
Genus Diclidurus - ghost batsNorthern ghost bat, Diclidurus albusGreater ghost bat, Diclidurus ingensIsabelle's ghost bat, Diclidurus isabellaLesser ghost bat, Diclidurus scutatusGenus EmballonuraSmall Asian sheath-tailed bat, Emballonura alectoBeccari's sheath-tailed bat, Emballonura beccariiLarge-eared sheath-tailed bat, Emballonura dianaeGreater sheath-tailed bat, Emballonura furaxLesser sheath-tailed bat, Emballonura monticolaRaffray's sheath-tailed bat, Emballonura raffrayanaPacific sheath-tailed bat, Emballonura semicaudataSeri's Sheathtail-bat, Emballonura seriiGenus MosiaDark sheath-tailed bat, Mosia nigrescensGenus ParemballonuraWestern sheath-tailed bat, Paremballonura tiavatoPeters's sheath-tailed bat, Paremballonura atrataGenus PeropteryxGreater dog-like bat, Peropteryx kappleriWhite-winged dog-like bat, Peropteryx leucopteraLesser dog-like bat, Peropteryx macrotisPale-winged dog-like bat, Peropteryx pallidopteraTrinidad dog-like bat, Peropteryx trinitatisGenus RhynchonycterisProboscis bat, Rhynchonycteris nasoGenus SaccolaimusYellow-bellied pouched bat, Saccolaimus flaviventrisTroughton's pouched bat, Saccolaimus mixtusPel's pouched bat, Saccolaimus peliNaked-rumped pouched bat, Saccolaimus saccolaimusGenus SaccopteryxAntioquian sac-winged bat, Saccopteryx antioquensisGreater sac-winged bat, Saccopteryx bilineataFrosted sac-winged bat, Saccopteryx canescensAmazonian sac-winged bat, Saccopteryx gymnuraLesser sac-winged bat, Saccopteryx lepturaGenus Taphozous Indonesian tomb bat (Taphozous achates)
 Coastal sheath-tailed bat (Taphozous australis)
 Common sheath-tailed bat (Taphozous georgianus)
 Hamilton's tomb bat (Taphozous hamiltoni)
 Hildegarde's tomb bat (Taphozous hildegardeae)
 Hill's sheath-tailed bat (Taphozous hilli)
 Arnhem sheath-tailed bat (Taphozous kapalgensis)
 Long-winged tomb bat (Taphozous longimanus)
 Mauritian tomb bat (Taphozous mauritianus)
 Black-bearded tomb bat (Taphozous melanopogon)
 Naked-rumped tomb bat (Taphozous nudiventris)
 Egyptian tomb bat (Taphozous perforatus)
 Theobald's tomb bat (Taphozous theobaldi)
 Troughton's sheath-tailed bat (Taphozous troughtoni'')

References

 
Bat families